A nanny is a person who provides child care. Typically, this care is given within the children's family setting. Throughout history, nannies were usually servants in large households and reported directly to the lady of the house. Today, modern nannies, like other domestic workers, may live in or out of the house, depending on their circumstances and those of their employers. Some employment agencies specialize in providing nannies, as there are families that specifically seek them and may make them a part of the household.

Nannies differ slightly from other child care providers. A childminder works out of their own home, operating as a small business. In America, childminders are often advertised as a daycare. Depending on the country the childminder or daycare is in, government registration may or may not be required. Within the UK, a childminder must be Ofsted registered, hold a current paediatric first aid qualification, public liability insurance and follow the EYFS. A mother's helper is someone who may live in or out of the household, and assists the person of the house with general chores as well as caring for the children. The term au pair usually refers to a young person, who comes from abroad to live with the host family and learn the local culture and language, while helping care for the children. A governess concentrates on educating children inside their own home, and a kindergarten or schoolteacher does the same, but in a school environment.

Even though there are no legal requirements to be considered a nanny, families may require a background check and a CPR certification. Families may also look for other special skills in a nanny, such as being bilingual or having early childhood development coursework done. Nannies help play a key role in a child's development by providing care.

History
In the 19th and early 20th centuries, a nanny was usually known as a "nurse", and was typically female. "Nurses" were found in higher-income homes, and "nurses" were either hired or were slaves. Originally, the hired person would have been expected to breastfeed the infant, a role known as a "wet nurse". In some households, the nurse was a senior member of the household staff and ran her own domain, a suite of rooms called the nursery. Some were supported by at least one assistant, known as a nursemaid (or nurserymaid). Because of their deep involvement in raising the children of the family, nannies were often remembered with great affection and treated more kindly than the junior servants.

Nannies were often present in the households of the colonial officials tasked with managing vast colonial empires. Nannies in colonial societies spent their lives in the homes of their masters, often from childhood till old age, taking care of more than one generation (depending on the duration of the post). It was not uncommon for these nannies to be brought along with the family when these colonial officials were posted either back to Europe or to another colony.

 In Colonial India, a nanny was known as ayah, after , nurse, governess . This term is presently part of the vocabulary of various languages of the Subcontinent, meaning also female servant or maid.

Types

Live-in nanny
A "live-in" nanny is much less common than it once was. Being a live-in nanny may be ideal for a person looking to move interstate or abroad for either a short period of time or to set themselves up financially. Typically, a live-in nanny is responsible for the entire care of the children of their employers. This includes anything from washing the children's clothes, tidying the children's rooms, supervising homework, preparing children's meals, taking children to and from school, and taking children to after-school sports and/or activities. Employee benefits may include a separate apartment (sometimes called a "nanny flat") or room, and possibly a car. While a live-in nanny was commonly available 24 hours a day in the past, this is much less common now and often these nannies work 10–12 hours on and the remainder of the day off. Essentially, these nannies are working while the children are awake and the parents are at work. A live-in nanny is nowadays more common among wealthier families because live-in nannies often have all their living expenses paid and provided by the employer.

Nanny share
Some families use what is known as a 'nanny share', where two or more families pay for the same nanny to care for the children in each family on a part-time basis.

Night nanny
A more recent addition to the role of a nanny is that of a night nanny. The night nanny usually works with a family anywhere from one night to seven nights per week. A night nanny generally works with children from newborn to five years of age. A night nanny can provide a teaching role, helping parents to establish good sleeping patterns or troubleshooting the sleeping patterns of a child. Roles and qualifications vary between countries. The night nanny works together with the family's requirements and philosophies. The qualifications of a night nanny are usually in mothercraft nursing (see sleep guidance specialist or early childhood development). Pay rates vary from country to country, but night nannies are usually well paid in comparison to the general nanny, as the night nanny is seen as a specialist or expert in their field.

Maternity nurse / newborn care specialists / confinement nanny

Historically, European women were confined to their beds or their homes for extended periods of time after giving birth. Care was provided either by her female relatives (mother or mother-in-law) or by a temporary attendant known as a monthly nurse. These weeks were called confinement or lying-in, and ended with the re-introduction of the mother to the community in the Christian ceremony of the churching of women. A modern version of this rest period has evolved with intentions to give maximum support to the new mother, especially if she is recovering from a difficult labor and delivery.

In the US these specialty maternity nannies are known as newborn care specialists (disassociating this specialty from medically qualified nursing). They are highly experienced in all aspects of newborns, aside from medical issues. They may work 24 hours a day, seven days per week, but most commonly work five nights/days a week for the first three months of a newborn's life. The role can consist of assisting parents with feeding guidance, nursery set up, premature infant, multiples, colic, reflux, and sleep guidance/training. There are various training organizations that offer non-accredited certifications, however, in an unregulated field parents should ensure that the qualifications of their maternity nanny are legitimate and accredited. The Newborn Care Specialist Association is one of many self-appointed certification entities. Some doulas specialize in postpartum care for mother and baby. Another related job is perinatal assistant.

Chinese and related East Asian traditions practice a form of postpartum confinement known in Chinese-speaking regions as zuo yue zi "sitting the month", which are traditions and customs regarding recovery from childbirth. The "confinement ladies" are referred to as yue sao, and they have specialized knowledge of how to care for both baby and mother. In Singapore and Malaysia, newborn care specialists are better known as confinement nannies. They assist the mother in taking care of the baby in order to let the mother have a good rest. Confinement food will be prepared to help with the recovery. Usually, the employment period will be about 28 days up to a maximum of 16 weeks. In Korea these postpartum care workers are called Sanhujorisa.

In the Netherlands, standard postnatal care, supported by state medical insurance, includes more than a week of all-day visits called kraamzorg. This kraamverzorgster ("maternity home care assistant") teaches the new mother how to care for her baby, measures both of their health, prepares light meals, entertains older children, performs light household tasks, cleans the home and disinfects the bathroom. They help care for the mother, baby, and family.

Demographic
Typically, women from their 20s to 60s take up employment as nannies. Some are younger, though normally younger workers are nursemaids or au pairs rather than nannies in the traditional use of the term.

A few positions are filled by men; the term manny is sometimes used for a male nanny, especially in the US and UK.

Qualifications
In the United States, and in the United Kingdom no formal qualifications are required to be a nanny.  However, some parents prefer or sometimes require their nanny to have a CPR and/or first aid certification.  Many Nannies have childhood education credits or degrees, though these are usually not required.

Notable nannies

British royal family
 Charlotte Bill (c. 1875–1965), known as Lalla, nanny of Prince John of the United Kingdom, featured in the film The Lost Prince
 Clara Knight, known as "Alla", nanny of Queen Elizabeth II and Princess Margaret
 Tiggy Legge-Bourke MVO (born 1965), nanny to Prince William and Prince Harry
 Lillian Sperling, head nanny of the show Nanny 911

Other royal families
 Margaretta Eagar (1863–1936), nanny to the four daughters of Tsar Nicholas II
 Louise von Sturmfeder (1789–1866), lady-in-waiting to the House of Habsburg and aja (then rendered "nurse", now nanny) to Franz Joseph I of Austria and his brother Maximilian I of Mexico

Other
 St. Josephine Bakhita (1869–1947), an enslaved African who worked as a nanny and later became a Roman Catholic saint in Italy
 Elizabeth Ann Everest (1832-1895), beloved nanny to the young Winston Churchill
 Deborah Carroll and Stella Reid, highly experienced nannies from the show Nanny 911
 Jo Frost, nanny who hosted a successful television program Supernanny in the UK and US, showing parents techniques to help with unruly children
 Yoselyn Ortega, nanny who murdered children Lucia and Leo Krim in 2012 by stabbing them to death.
 Sandra Samuel (b. 1964), an Indian nanny who saved the life of a child during the November 2008 Mumbai attacks in which the baby's two parents were murdered; later honored with honorary Israeli citizenship.

Fictional representations

Women and girls
 Mary Poppins, from P. L. Travers' children's book series, set in Edwardian London, played by Julie Andrews in its film and stage adaptations and Emily Blunt in the sequel
 Mrs. Bird, nanny and housekeeper to the Browns in Michael Bond's classic Paddington Bear series 
 Mrs. Baylock, in the film The Omen (1976)
 The unnamed nanny portrayed by Bette Davis in the film The Nanny (1965)
 Phoebe Figalily, in the U.S. sitcom Nanny and the Professor which starred Juliet Mills and Richard Long
 Fran Fine, portrayed by Fran Drescher in the sitcom The Nanny
 Peyton Flanders / Mrs. Mott (portrayed by Rebecca De Mornay), the nanny in the film The Hand That Rocks the Cradle (1992)
 Nanny, a character in Kay Thompson's 1950s Eloise book series and its different adaptations
 Nanny, on the television series Jim Henson's Muppet Babies
 Nanny Hawkins, from Evelyn Waugh's book Brideshead Revisited (1945)
 Nanny Hutchinson, in the novel The Nanny Diaries (2002) and its sequel Nanny Returns (2010), by former nannies Emma McLaughlin and Nicola Kraus
 Nanny McPhee, the titular character in the film Nanny McPhee (2005), based on Christianna Brand's Nurse Matilda book series 
 Clara Oswin Oswald, a nanny in both the present and Victorian era, in the British science fiction TV show Doctor Who
 Amelia Hernández, portrayed by Adriana Barraza in the 2006 film Babel
 Kate Hewitt (portrayed by Vanessa Marcil), a nanny in the 2008 Hallmark Channel film The Nanny Express.
 Rita (portrayed by Di Quon) from Grown Ups is a nanny who watches over the kids of Lenny Feder (portrayed by Adam Sandler) and Roxanne Chase-Feder (portrayed by Salma Hayek).
 Jessie Prescott (portrayed by Debby Ryan), a nanny in the Disney Channel sitcom Jessie
 Breda McQueen, played by Moya Brady, nanny to the Lomax family in UK soap opera Hollyoaks
 Mary Taylor, portrayed by Patti Clare, nanny to the Alahan family in UK soap opera Coronation Street

Men and boys
 Andy the Manny (portrayed by Adam DeVine), in the television series Modern Family
 Sean Armstrong (portrayed by Hulk Hogan), an ex-wrestler in the movie Mr. Nanny (1993)
 Lynn Aloysius Belvedere (portrayed by Christopher Hewett), in the sitcom Mr. Belvedere
 Charles (portrayed by Scott Baio), a 19-year-old student and live-in babysitter in exchange for room and board, in the sitcom Charles in Charge
 Daniel Hillard / Euphegenia Doubtfire (portrayed by Robin Williams) a voice actor and father of three young children, in the movie Mrs. Doubtfire (1993)
 Joseph Paul "Joe" Longo (portrayed by Joey Lawrence), a former executive and commodities trader with an MBA who lost his job, money, and marriage and agrees to be the live-in nanny to assist his girlfriend, politician Mel, and give advice to her niece and nephew in the television series Melissa & Joey
 The Manny, in Christian Burch's books The Manny Files (2006) and Hit the Road, Manny (2008)
 Tony Micelli (portrayed by Tony Danza), a retired baseball player and single father, in the sitcom Who's the Boss
 Angus Partridge (portrayed by Dallas Roberts), in the television series The L Word
 Lieutenant Shane Wolfe (portrayed by Vin Diesel), a United States Navy SEAL assigned to stay at the Plummer residence, to search for a secret project hidden somewhere in the house, and meanwhile to look after the family's five children, in the film The Pacifier (2005)
 Grant Gordon (portrayed by Justin Chatwin, secret identity of superhero "The Ghost", works for reporter Lucy Fletcher as a nanny in the Doctor Who Christmas Special "The Return of Doctor Mysterio."

Animals
 Nana, a Newfoundland dog, in Peter Pan

Television
Various television programs feature real nannies, many of whom help parents discipline children. These include Abismo de pasión (in Spanish), Nanny 911, Supernanny, and Take Home Nanny.

In addition, several television series feature fictional Nannie’s including the comedy titled “The Nanny” as well as the popular Disney series “Jessie”.

References

External links

NCMA the National Childminding Association website
SCMA the Scottish Childminding Association website
NICMA the Northern Ireland Childminding Association website
OFSTED the Ofsted website
USA Today article on CEO nannies

Child care
Child care occupations
Domestic work
Gendered occupations